Praeparkinsonia is an extinct genus from a well-known class of fossil cephalopods, the ammonites. It lived during the Jurassic Period.

Distribution
None cataloged.

References

Jurassic ammonites